Shmuel Schneersohn (or Rabbi Shmuel of Lubavitch or The Rebbe Maharash) (29 April 1834 – 14 September 1882 OS) was an Orthodox rabbi and the fourth Rebbe (spiritual leader) of the Chabad Lubavitch Chasidic movement.

Biography

Shmuel Schneersohn was born in Lyubavichi, on 2 Iyar 5594 (1834), the seventh son of Menachem Mendel Schneersohn. He faced competition from three of his brothers, primarily from Yehuda Leib Schneersohn who established a dynasty in Kapust upon their father's death. Other brothers also established dynasties in Lyady, Nizhyn, and Ovruch.

In 1848, Schneersohn was married to the daughter of his brother, Chaim Shneur Zalman Schneersohn. After several months she died, and he then married Rivkah, a granddaughter of his own grandfather Dovber Schneuri. He had three sons, Zalman Aharon, Shalom Dovber, and Menachem Mendel, as well as one daughter, Devorah Leah.

Schneersohn was said to have had chariots on call for the evacuation of books in time of fire.

Besides his communal activism, he had wide intellectual interests. He spoke several languages, including Latin. He wrote widely on a range of religious and secular topics, and much of his writing has never been published and remains in manuscript form alone. His discourses began to be published for the first time under the title Likkutei Torat Shmuel in 1945 by Kehot, and 12 volumes have so far been printed.

He died in Lyubavichi, on 13 Tishrei 5643 (1882),  leaving three sons and two daughters, and was succeeded by his son Sholom Dovber.

Schneersohn urged the study of Kabbalah as a prerequisite for one's humanity:
A person who is capable of comprehending the seder hishtalshelus (kabbalistic secrets concerning the coming-into-being of all existence every moment) - and fails to do so - cannot be considered a human being. At every moment and time one must know where his soul stands. It is a mitzvah (commandment) and an obligation to know the seder hishtalshelus.

Works
"Likkutei Torah L'Sholosh Parshiyos" - Discourses based on the first three parshiyos in Torah Ohr of the Alter Rebbe
"Likkutei Torah - Toras Shmuel 5626-5642" 35 volumes - discourses in order of the parshiyos and festivals
"Sefer hasichos Toras Shmuel"
"Igros Kodesh" A collection of over 70 surviving letters and Halachik responsa

Aphorisms
"The world says, 'If you can't crawl under, climb over.' But I say, Lechatchilah Ariber--'At the outset, one should climb over.'"
"You cannot fool God; ultimately, you cannot fool others either. The only one you can fool is yourself. And to fool a fool is no great achievement."
"because better is better, is good not good? rather good is good, and better is better!"
"Why are you demanding of me? Demand of yourself! If you toil and fill your mind with Torah there won't be any space for foreign thoughts! break your desires and you will feel great pleasure in prayer!"

References

External links
 A biography of The Rebbe Maharash - Rabbi Shmuel Schneersohn
 Family Tree
 Sefer Toras Shmuel by Rabbi Shmuel Schneersohn

1834 births
1882 deaths
People from Rudnyansky District, Smolensk Oblast
People from Orshansky Uyezd
Schneersohn family
Rebbes of Lubavitch
Russian Hasidic rabbis
Hasidic rabbis in Europe
Kabbalists
Philosophers of Judaism